Gundam Battle is a series of games made for the Sony PlayStation Portable and PlayStation Vita game consoles, all based on a similar game engine.  Currently there are six games in the series.

Gundam Battle Tactics

Gundam Battle Tactics, released on September 22, 2005, is a third-person action/mech-combat simulation game for the PlayStation Portable, based on Japan's long-running mecha-based series, Gundam.  Tactics, released only in Japan and South Korea, was later followed with a sequel, Gundam Battle Royale, also for the PlayStation Portable, in late 2006.  This game follows the events of the One Year War and most scenarios are heavily influenced by animation episodes from One Year War storylines, namely Mobile Suit Gundam, The 08th MS Team, War in the Pocket, and Blue Destiny.  This game plays similarly to another Bandai Gundam game for the Sony PlayStation 2, Mobile Suit Gundam: Lost War Chronicles.

Gundam Battle Royale

Gundam Battle Royale is a game released for the PlayStation Portable.  The game was released only in Japan and South Korea on October 5, 2006.  The game features many mobile suits and mobile armors from the Universal Century up to and including Zeta Gundam.  It is the sequel to Gundam Battle Tactics.  A sequel called Gundam Battle Chronicles has been released on 25 October 2007.

Gundam Battle Chronicle

Gundam Battle Chronicle is the sequel to Gundam Battle Royale and Gundam Battles series.  It features over 140 Mobile units including the 80 units in Gundam Battle Royale and improved the multi-player gaming system so that the single-player missions could be played in multi-player's mission mode.  New additional missions are from Stardust Memory, and MSs from Gundam ZZ, Gundam Sentinel, and Char's Counterattack.

Gundam Battle Universe

The fourth sequel of Gundam Battle series was released on July 17, 2008 in Japan.  It features over 200 MS units (including F91 in Mobile Suit Gundam F91 and Ξ Gundam in Mobile Suit Gundam: Hathaway's Flash) can be selected; two UC stories (Mobile Suit Gundam ZZ and Mobile Suit Gundam: Char's Counterattack) become as a part of the campaign.  On the other hand, every characters have 2 personal abilities (passive which is activated for all times and additional which is activated when player's HP gauge is at 30%). This game can inherit the Gundam Battle Chronicle's save data.  The game also let players use the ad hoc function to help each other in the normal campaign mode, unlike the previous games, which multiplayer mode is only available in the main menu.

Gundam Assault Survive

Gundam Assault Survive is the fifth game in the Gundam Battle series. Unlike its predecessors, it expands beyond the Universal Century and into Gundam series from alternate universes. Mobile Suit Gundam F91, Mobile Suit Gundam SEED and the first season of Mobile Suit Gundam 00 all become part of the campaign, while Mobile Suit Victory Gundam contributes MS. The game was released on March 18, 2010 in Japan.

Mobile Suit Gundam SEED: Battle Destiny

Mobile Suit Gundam SEED: Battle Destiny is the sixth game in the Gundam Battle series, and the first in the series to be released on the PlayStation Vita. Unlike its predecessors, this installment in the series exclusively features mobile suits, characters, and scenarios from the "Cosmic Era" timeline featured in Mobile Suit Gundam SEED and its sequel and spinoffs, Mobile Suit Gundam SEED DESTINY, Mobile Suit Gundam SEED MSV, Mobile Suit Gundam SEED Astray, and Mobile Suit Gundam SEED C.E. 73: Stargazer. It features a Story Mission mode, which allows players to play through the events Of Gundam SEED and Gundam SEED DESTINY, as well as a Free Mission option that features Extra Missions, scenarios usually featuring a unique theme or an adaptation of stories unrelated to the Story Mission mode, and VS Missions, an ad-hoc multiplayer mode that features four game modes with customizable rules.

When creating characters for Story Mission mode, players are given the decision to make them pilots for either the Alliance or ZAFT. If the player chooses Alliance, they are then given the choice to make the characters either Naturals or Coordinators. Naturals have two freely customizable Passive Skill slots, but suffer a decrease in performance when using Coordinator-use mobile suits. Coordinators have one of their Passive Skill slots permanently locked with the "Coordinator" skill, but they may use all mobile suits without any penalties. If the player chooses ZAFT as the character's faction, the created character is automatically made a Coordinator. Partway through Story Mission mode, the players actions in certain missions with branching paths may determine whether they may stay with their selected faction, or defect to the side of the Archangel/Three Ships Alliance. If this happens, the player may no longer gain new missions to continue the story of the faction they reject unless they create a new character.

2005 video games
Action video games
Artdink games
Bandai games
PlayStation Portable games
PlayStation Portable-only games
PlayStation Vita games
PlayStation Vita-only games
Japan-exclusive video games
Gundam video games
Video games developed in Japan

ja:ガンダムバトルユニバース